Mighty to Save is the fifteenth album in the live praise and worship series of contemporary worship music by Hillsong Church. It was released in July 2006, at the annual Hillsong Conference. The album peaked at No. 25 on the ARIA Albums Chart.

Track listing (CD)

"Mighty to Save" was nominated for Song of the Year at the 40th GMA Dove Awards.

Track listing (DVD)
 "Take It All" (Marty Sampson)
 "I Believe" (Jonathon Douglass)
 "The Freedom We Know" (Joel Houston)
 "For Who You Are" (Jad Gillies)
 "You Alone Are God" (Reuben Morgan)
 "Open My Eyes" (Marty Sampson & Mia Fieldes) (Darlene Zschech)
 "Deep of Your Grace" (Mia Fieldes) (Mia Fieldes)
 "From the Inside Out" (Marty Sampson)
 "Found" (Dave George)
 "More to See" (Women of Hillsong)
 "Follow the Son" (Jay Cook & Gio Galanti) (Jonathon Douglass)
 "Adonai" (Paul Andrew)
 "Higher/I Believe in You" (Darlene Zschech)
 "Oceans Will Part" (Annie Garratt)
 "None but Jesus" (Brooke Fraser) (Darlene Zschech)
 "At the Cross" (Reuben Morgan and Darlene Zschech) (Darlene Zschech)
 "Mighty to Save" (Ben Fielding and Reuben Morgan) (Reuben Morgan)
 "How Great Is Our God" (Chris Tomlin, Jesse Reeves & Ed Cash) (Darlene Zschech)

Personnel

Executive producer
Darlene Zschech (worship pastor)

Producers
Darlene Zschech
Joel Houston
Andrew Crawford

Creative director
Phil Dooley

Worship leaders
Darlene Zschech – worship pastor, senior worship leader, senior lead vocal, songwriter
Reuben Morgan – worship leader, acoustic guitar, songwriter
Marty Sampson – worship leader, acoustic guitar, songwriter
Joel Houston – united worship leader, acoustic guitar, songwriter
Jad Gillies – worship leader, acoustic guitar, electric guitar
Jonathan Douglass – worship leader
Annie Garratt – worship leader
Marcus Temu – worship leader
Miriam Webster – worship leader
 Dave George – worship leader, keyboards
Paul Andrew – worship leader

Vocals
Steve McPherson – vocals, vocal production
Damian Bassett
Julie Bassett – vocals, vocal production
Debbie-Ann Bax
Erica Crocker
Kathryn D'Araujo
Deb Ezzy – vocals, songwriter
Mia Fields – vocals, songwriter
Lucy Fisher
Michelle Fragar
Dave George
Scott Haslem
Karen Horn
Vera Kasevich
Sam Knock
Donia Makedonez
Barry Southgate
Katrina Tadman
Dee Uluirewa
Aaron Watson
Holly Watson
Peter Wilson - vocals, acoustic guitar

Songwriters
Darlene Zschech
Reuben Morgan
Marty Sampson
Joel Houston
Matt Crocker
Scott Ligertwood
Matthew Tennikoff
Ben Fielding
Dave George
Mia Fields
Deborah Ezzy
Donia Makedonez
Nigel Hendroff
Raymond Badham
Brooke Fraser
Chris Tomlin
Jeese Reeves
Ed Cash

Choir
 Hillsong Church Choir

Senior pastors
Brian & Bobbie Houston

Album cover
Cover depicts: Darlene Zschech (main image), Reuben Morgan, Marty Sampson, Joel Houston, Annie Garratt, Rolf Wam Fjell, Matthew Tennikoff and Jonathan Douglass

Musicians
Nigel Hendroff – electric guitar
Matthew Tennikoff – bass guitar
Jad Gillies  – guitar acoustic, electric
Roma Kasevich - electric guitar
Raymond Badham – electric guitar
Alvin Douglass – keyboards
Rolf Wam Fjell – drums
Timon Klein – electric guitar
Kevin Lee – keyboards
Mitch Farmer – drums
Autumn Hardman – keyboards
Ian Fisher – bass guitar
Dave George – keyboards
Peter James – keyboards
Peter King – keyboards
Peter Kelly – percussion
John Kasinathan - trombone
Stephanie Lambert - trumpet
Jonno Louwrens - alto saxophone
Jared Marchman - alto saxophone
Karen Thompson - tenor saxophone

Certifications
The video of this album received a gold certification from the CRIA with 5,000 units.

Awards

The title song, "Mighty to Save", won a Dove Award for Worship Song of the Year at the 40th GMA Dove Awards.

References

2006 live albums
2006 video albums
Live video albums
Hillsong Music video albums
Hillsong Music live albums